Ficus salzmanniana is a species of fig tree in the family Moraceae, native to Brazil.

The tree is endemic to Bahia state, in the Atlantic Forest ecoregion of Southeastern Brazil.

It is an IUCN Red List Endangered species.

References

Sources

salzmanniana
Endemic flora of Brazil
Flora of Bahia
Flora of the Atlantic Forest
Endangered flora of South America
Taxonomy articles created by Polbot